Idulio Islas Gómez (born January 16, 1987 in Morelos) is a Mexican taekwondo practitioner. He won a silver medal for the 68 kg division at the 2009 World Taekwondo Championships in Copenhagen, Denmark, and bronze at the 2011 Summer Universiade in Shenzhen, China.

Islas qualified for the men's 68 kg class at the 2008 Summer Olympics in Beijing, after placing third from  the Pan American Qualification Tournament in Cali, Colombia. He lost the preliminary round of sixteen match by a superiority decision to Nigeria's Isah Adam Muhammad, after the pair had tied 2–2.

See also
List of people from Morelos, Mexico

References

External links

NBC 2008 Olympics profile

Mexican male taekwondo practitioners
1987 births
Living people
Olympic taekwondo practitioners of Mexico
Taekwondo practitioners at the 2008 Summer Olympics
Sportspeople from Morelos
Universiade medalists in taekwondo
Universiade bronze medalists for Mexico
World Taekwondo Championships medalists
Medalists at the 2011 Summer Universiade
21st-century Mexican people